Nedko Milenov (Bulgarian: Недко Миленов) (born 9 October 1978) is a football midfielder from Bulgaria.

Career
His career started from the little club FC Trakia Zvanichevo. Between 1998 and 2000, he played for PFC Velbazhd. He went to PFC Botev Plovdiv on a free transfer in early 2000. Milenov spent several seasons playing for Botev in the A PFG.

References

Bulgarian footballers
1978 births
Living people
Association football midfielders
PFC Velbazhd Kyustendil players
PFC Beroe Stara Zagora players
Botev Plovdiv players
FC Lyubimets players
First Professional Football League (Bulgaria) players
Sportspeople from Pazardzhik